May Buckley (December 15, 1875 – 1941) was an American actress on stage from childhood into the late 1930s, and in silent films in 1912-1913. Her private life was often in newspaper headlines, especially in 1901, when a man who claimed to be her husband shot at her in a hotel dining room, wounding one of her dining companions.

Early life 
Marie Uhl was born in San Francisco, California, "of a theatrical family", daughter of Ernest Uhl and Marie Featherston Uhl. Her mother died during Marie's birth. Her father's friend, actor Dion Boucicault, gave her the stage name "May Buckley" when she was a child actor.

Career
May Buckley was active on the Broadway stage, with roles in Hearts are Trumps (1900), Caleb West (1900), The Price of Peace (1901), A Japanese Nightingale (1903), The Shepherd King (1904), The Galloper (1906), The Right of Way (1907), Cameo Kirby (1909-1910), Where There's a Will (1910), The Little Damozel (1910), The Unwritten Law (1913), Pigs (1924-1925), These Days (1928), Tell Me Pretty Maiden (1937-1938). She also appeared on the London stage.

Buckley appeared in more than twenty short silent films in 1912 and 1913, including Paid in His Own, The Poor Relation, In Dis-a-Countree, Betty and the Doctor, Mother Love, His Wife's Mother, Rice and Old Shoes, Hello, Central!, The Sacrifice, A Complicated Campaign, Won by Waiting, The Railroad Engineer, Darby and Joan, The Honeymooners, A Modern Portia, The Runaways, What the Driver Saw, The Back Window, The Derelict's Return, Until We Three Meet Again, The Man in the Street, The Toils of Deception, and Miss 'Arabian Nights'''.

During World War I she was one of the organizers of the Stage Women's War Relief Association, holding benefits to raise funds for a disabled soldiers' home. In the 1920s and 1930s she was active in the Catholic Actors' Guild.

Personal life
Buckley's first husband was Frank Baruch, also known as Frank Clayton or Frank Cormier; they married in 1894 and divorced in 1897. In 1899, against her contract under manager Charles Frohman, she married millionaire Wilmot H. Garlick. They separated the following year. She was possibly married to Robert Hayden Moulton, before he shot at her and wounded one of her dining companions in New York in 1901. 

In 1908 she married fellow actor Charles Walter Martin-Sabine, also known as Charles W. S. Martin, in Denver. At the time of her marriage Buckley was appearing at the Elitch Theatre and the owner, Mary Elitch Long shared the event in her biography: "Walter Bellows led the beautiful bride to the altar of roses on the porch of my bungalow, where waited Mr. Walter Sabine...the man of her choice."  They divorced in 1910. 

In 1912, Buckley was sued by another actress (stage name of Camille Personi) for alienation of affections, concerning her co-star, actor John Halliday. "'May Buckley has broken up my home and ruined my life,' Mrs. Halliday said, 'and I am determined that she shall suffer.'"

Unknown death date
The only known source of her death is Silent Film Necrology , Vazzana, c. 2001 [disputable] which states she died in or about 1941. Another possible hit is that she died June 29, 1962 and that she's buried under her real name "Marie H. Uhl" as the entry has no date or place of birth and the place of burial is in New Haven Connecticut not far from New York theatre district Broadway. However her last Broadway credit is from 1937. 

FilmographyPaid in His Own Coin (1912)*shortThe Poor Relation (1912)*shortIn Dis-a-Countree (1912)*shortBetty and the Doctor (1912)*shortMother Love (1912) *shortHis Wife's Mother (1912)*shortRice and Old Shoes (1912)*shortHello, Central! (1912)The Sacrifice (1912)*shortA Complicated Campaign (1912)*shortWon by Waiting (1912)*shortThe Railroad Engineer (1912)*shortDarby and Joan (1912)*shortThe Honeymooners (1912)*shortA Modern Portia (1912)*shortThe Runaways (1912)*shortWhat the Driver Saw (1912)*shortThe Back Window (1912)*shortThe Derelict's Return (1912)*shortUntil We Three Meet Again (1913)*shortthe Man in the Street (1913)*shortThe Toils of Deception (1913)*shortMiss 'Arabian Nights' (1913)*short

References

External links

A 1902 portrait of May Buckley by Marceau, in the J. Willis Sayre Collection of Theatrical Photographs, University of Washington Libraries.

1875 births
1941 deaths
Year of death uncertain
American actresses
American women in World War I